Hikkim is a village in Lahaul and Spiti district in the northern Indian state of Himachal Pradesh at an elevation of . It is one of the highest year-round inhabited locations in India, with residences from 4330 to 4400 m. Tangyud Monastery in adjacent Komic village 2 km to the southeast has residences up to 4520 m, and Korzok Monastery in adjacent Korzok village on Tso Moriri has year-round residences up to 4570 m. Most of the population is Buddhist. People use stones and wood extensively to build houses and structures.

Access
Hikkim village is situated at a very high elevation in the Himalayas. The village and the region itself remain cut off from other parts of the Himachal Pradesh state for half the year due to heavy snowfall over the mountain passes.

One of the Highest post offices in the world
Inarguably ,  the post office located in India's highest altitude . The post office connects small villages in this isolated region to the rest of the world. It receives and sends postal letters. It also acts as a savings bank where villagers can deposit money in their savings accounts or withdraw money. Intrepid travellers make it this far to Hikkim village to take pride in mailing their letters from the highest post office on Earth. The Postal Index Number or PIN of the village is 172114.

Rinchen Chhering has been the postmaster since its inception in 1983. The mail is carried on foot to Kaza. The post office is forced to shut during winter months due to heavy snowfall.

Record of highest polling station
Hikkim village was the world's highest polling station. It was recorded in the Limca Book of Records. Later the record was held with Tashigang, a small Himachal Pradesh village in the same district.

Climate
According to the Köppen-Geiger system, Hikkim's climate is a subarctic climate (Dfc).

See also
 List of highest towns by country
 List of highest cities in the world

References

External links
 Elevation of Hikkim - Veloroutes.org
 Himachal - Daily post India
 Grow in letter and spirit(India post) - The Tribune, Chandigarh
 Oldest Voter, Highest Polling Booth in Himachal Pradesh  - Press Information Bureau, Indian Government

Villages in Lahaul and Spiti district
Highest points of Indian states and union territories